Baruni Hill is a small hill in the Himalayan state of Manipur and the abode of God Nongpok Ningthou.

References

Mountains of India
Hills of Manipur